The following lists events that happened during 2014 in Indonesia.

Incumbents
 President: Susilo Bambang Yudhoyono (until 20 October), Joko Widodo (starting 20 October)
 Vice President: Boediono (until 20 October), Jusuf Kalla (starting 20 October)
 Chief Justice: Muhammad Hatta Ali

Events

January
 January 1 – Police exchange gunfire with suspected militants near Jakarta, killing six people.
 January 1 – Sinabung volcano erupts, displacing more than 19,000 people.
 January 17 – Australia apologizes to Indonesia for breaching its territorial waters while conducting operations against people smugglers in Operation Sovereign Borders.
 January 20 – Monsoon rains cause flooding in Jakarta causing the evacuation of more than 30,000 people.
 January 20 – Hong Kong arrests an employer for abusing an Indonesian maid which resulted in protests by migrant workers from Indonesia and the Philippines in the Chinese territory.

February
 February 1 – Mount Sinabung erupts killing 14 people.
 February 7 – Schapelle Corby is granted parole (along with 1,290 others) in Indonesia after serving nine years in a Bali prison for drug smuggling.
 February 13 – Mount Kelud erupts prompting the evacuation of 200,000 people on Java.
 February 14 – The eruption of Mount Kelud on the island of Java causes the closure of airports in three cities Surabaya, Yogyakarta and Solo as well as the reported death of two people.
 February 24 – The death toll in the Papua province reaches 11 people as torrential rain continues to form floods and landslides, occurring since Saturday.

March

April

May

June

July

August

September

October

November

December
 December 13 – Caused by heavy rain, the Banjarnegara landslides kill at least 93 people, with 23 unaccounted for and presumed dead.
 December 19 – The Gamalama erupts injuring four people and leaving one person missing.
 December 28 – Indonesia AirAsia Flight 8501 is reported missing en route from Surabaya to Singapore.
 December 30 – After two days of uncertainty, Flight 8501 was found crashed onto the Java Sea in Karimata Strait. A live television footage (which caused a mass hysteria) purportedly shows a body floating on the water, confirming the crash of the flight. All 162 people on board were dead.

 
Indonesia
Indonesia
2010s in Indonesia
Years of the 21st century in Indonesia